Beta-1,3-galactosyl-O-glycosyl-glycoprotein beta-1,3-N-acetylglucosaminyltransferase (O-glycosyl-oligosaccharide-glycoprotein N-acetylglucosaminyltransferase II, uridine diphosphoacetylglucosamine-mucin beta(1->3)-acetylglucosaminyltransferase (elongating), elongation 3beta-GalNAc-transferase, UDP-N-acetyl-D-glucosamine:O-glycosyl-glycoprotein (N-acetyl-D-glucosamine to beta-D-galactose of beta-D-galactosyl-1,3-(N-acetyl-D-glucosaminyl-1,6)-N-acetyl-D-galactosaminyl-R) beta-1,3-N-acetyl-D-glucosaminyltransferase) is an enzyme with systematic name UDP-N-acetyl-D-glucosamine:beta-D-galactosyl-(1->3)-(N-acetyl-D-glucosaminyl-(1->6))-N-acetyl-D-galactosaminyl-R 3-beta-N-acetyl-D-glucosaminyltransferase. This enzyme catalyses the following chemical reaction

 UDP-N-acetyl-D-glucosamine + beta-D-galactosyl-(1->3)-[N-acetyl-D-glucosaminyl-(1->6)]-N-acetyl-D-galactosaminyl-R  UDP + N-acetyl-beta-D-glucosaminyl-(1->3)-beta-D-galactosyl-(1->3)-[N-acetyl-beta-D-glucosaminyl-(1->6)]-N-acetyl-D-galactosaminyl-R

See also 
 EC 2.4.1.102 (beta-1,3-galactosyl-O-glycosyl-glycoprotein beta-1,6-N-acetylglucosaminyltransferase)
 EC 2.4.1.147 (acetylgalactosaminyl-O-glycosyl-glycoprotein beta-1,3-N-acetylglucosaminyltransferase)
 EC 2.4.1.148 (acetylgalactosaminyl-O-glycosyl-glycoprotein beta-1,6-N-acetylglucosaminyltransferase).

References

External links 
 

EC 2.4.1